Andrés Stanovnik O.F.M. Cap. (December 15, 1949) is a prelate of the Roman Catholic Church. He served as bishop of Reconquista from 2001 until 2007, when he became archbishop of Corrientes.

Life 
Born in Buenos Aires, Stanovnik became a member of the Order of Friars Minor Capuchin on July 16, 1978. He was ordained to the priesthood on September 2, 1978.

On October 30, 2001, he was appointed bishop of Reconquista. Stanovnik received his episcopal consecration on the following December 16 from Jorge Mario Bergoglio, archbishop of Buenos Aires, the future Pope Francis, with bishop of Posadas, Juan Rubén Martinez, bishop emeritus of San Luis, Juan Rodolfo Laise, nuncio for Argentina, archbishop Santos Abril y Castelló, and bishop of Venado Tuerto, Gustavo Arturo Help, serving as co-consecrators.

On September 27, 2007, he was appointed archbishop of Corrientes.

External links 

 catholic-hierarchy.org, Bishop Andrés Stanovnik

1949 births
21st-century Roman Catholic archbishops in Argentina
Living people
Capuchins
Argentine people of Slovenian descent
Roman Catholic archbishops of Corrientes